Nquthu Local Municipality is an administrative area in the Umzinyathi District of KwaZulu-Natal in South Africa. Nquthu is an isiZulu name meaning "the back of the head".

Isandlwana, the site of the historic Anglo-Zulu war battle which took place on 22 January 1879, is a well known tourist destination worldwide.

Main places
The 2001 census divided the municipality into the following main places:

Politics 

The municipal council consists of thirty-seven members elected by mixed-member proportional representation. Seventeen councillors are elected by first-past-the-post voting in seventeen wards, while the remaining sixteen are chosen from party lists so that the total number of party representatives is proportional to the number of votes received.

In the election of 1 November 2021 the Inkatha Freedom Party (IFP) won a majority of nineteen seats.

The following table shows the results of the 2021 election.

References

External links
 http://www.nquthu.gov.za/

Local municipalities of the Umzinyathi District Municipality